Mark Anthony Lee (born March 20, 1958) is a former American football cornerback in the National Football League (NFL). He was drafted by the Green Bay Packers in the second round of the 1980 NFL Draft. He played college football at Washington. Lee was inducted into the Packers Hall of Fame in 2017. Lee also played for the San Francisco 49ers and New Orleans Saints.

Professional career

Green Bay Packers
Lee was drafted by the Green Bay Packers in the second round of the 1980 NFL Draft. He played for the Packers from 1980 to 1990 and started 140 of 157 games and recorded 31 interceptions. Lee had a career high nine interceptions in the 1986 season, which as of 2017, is still the second most in a single season in Packers history.

On July 22, 2017 he was inducted into the Green Bay Packers Hall of Fame.

San Francisco 49ers and New Orleans Saints
Lee played the 1991 season for the San Francisco 49ers and New Orleans Saints. He started four of five games and had an interception with the 49ers and started two of three games for the Saints.

References

External links
Green Bay Packers bio

1958 births
Living people
People from Hanford, California
American football cornerbacks
Washington Huskies football players
Green Bay Packers players
San Francisco 49ers players
New Orleans Saints players
Players of American football from California